Phalonidia brevifasciaria is a species of moth of the family Tortricidae. It is found in Guizhou, China.

The wingspan is about 11.5 mm. The ground colour of the forewings is yellowish white, mixed with fine yellow strigulae (streaks). The hindwings are pale grey.

Etymology
The species name refers to the short subapical fascia and is derived from the Latin prefix brevi- (meaning short) and fasciarius (meaning fascia).

References

Moths described in 2013
Phalonidia